Ali Shamkhani (Persian: , born 29 September 1955) is an Iranian two-star general. He is the secretary of the Supreme National Security Council of Iran.

Early life and education
Shamkhani was born on 29 September 1955 in Ahvaz, Khuzestan. His family is of Iranian Arab origin. Before the Iranian Revolution, Shamkhani was member of a clandestine Islamist guerilla group named Mansouroun, engaging in armed struggle against the Pahlavi dynasty. After the revolution, he joined the Mojahedin of the Islamic Revolution Organization. He studied engineering at Shahid Chamran University of Ahvaz.

Career
Shamkhani served as the commander of the IRGC navy with the rank of rear admiral. Later he also commanded the Artesh navy in addition to the IRGC navy. He was appointed the Minister of Revolutionary Guards in 1988.

He held the post of the minister of defense from August 1997 until August 2005 in the government of Mohammad Khatami. Shamkani was replaced by Mostafa Mohammad-Najjar in the post. Shamkhani also ran for office in the 2001 presidential elections.

He was the director of the Iranian Armed Forces' Center for Strategic Studies from 2005 to 2013. He is also military advisor to the Supreme Leader, Ayatollah Ali Khamenei.

On 10 September 2013, Shamkhani was appointed secretary of the Supreme National Security Council (SNSC) by Supreme Leader Ali Khamenei.

After the US airstrike that was responsible for killing on 3 January 2020 the head of IRGC's Quds force Qasem Soleimani as he travelled in Baghdad Iraq, Shamkhani said on 6 January of the response that it would be a "historic nightmare" for the US: "Even if the weakest of these scenarios gains a consensus, the implementation of it can be a historic nightmare for the Americans... The entirety of the resistance forces will retaliate," he said to the Fars News Agency. The SNSC was assessing 13 revenge scenarios.

On 10 January 2020, the US State Department extended its sanctions under Executive Order 13876 to Shamkhani and seven other individuals, and "twenty-two entities and three vessels pursuant to Executive Order 13871" as well as a Chinese steel trading organization under the Iran Freedom and Counter-Proliferation Act.

On 20 February 2020, the US Treasury Department extended its sanctions again under Executive Order 13876 to Shamkhani amongst other individuals, following "the disqualification of several thousand electoral candidates by Iran’s Guardian Council".

At a Baghdad news conference after meeting with Iraqi politicians on 7 March 2020, Shamkhani said "Zionists are against regional security."

Awards and honors
In 2003, Shamkhani received the Shoja'at Medal, the highest military medal from President Mohammad Khatami. He was also honored for his eight years service as minister of defense in 2005. In 2004, Shamkhani received the Order of Abdulaziz Al Saud, the highest award in Saudi Arabia from King Fahd for his prominent role in the design and implementation in developing relations with Arabic countries in the Persian Gulf. He is the first Iranian minister to receive the medal.

See also 
 List of Iranian two-star generals since 1979

References

External links

1955 births
Living people
People from Ahvaz
Iranian Arab military personnel
Islamic Revolutionary Guard Corps personnel of the Iran–Iraq War
Defence ministers of Iran
Candidates in the 2001 Iranian presidential election
Recipients of the Order of Fath
Islamic Republic of Iran Navy rear admirals
Mojahedin of the Islamic Revolution Organization politicians
Representatives of the Supreme Leader
Commanders of Islamic Republic of Iran Navy
Shahid Chamran University of Ahvaz alumni
Iranian civil servants
Iranian individuals subject to the U.S. Department of the Treasury sanctions